Christelle Diallo (born March 12, 1993 in Issy-Les-Moulineaux, France) is a French basketball player who plays for club Bourges basket of the League feminine de basket, the top basketball league for women in France.

References

French women's basketball players
1993 births
Living people